Joel Shukovsky is an American television producer. He worked as a producer for television programs including Murphy Brown, Love & War and The Louie Show.

Shukovsky won two Primetime Emmy Awards and two nominations for Outstanding Comedy Series from (1989-1992). He also wrote a column for The Huffington Post.

He is principal owner of the company Shukovsky English Entertainment (formerly Shukovsky English Productions).

References

External links 

Rotten Tomatoes profile

Living people
Year of birth missing (living people)
American television producers
American producers
Primetime Emmy Award winners